The 2009–10 Longwood Lancers men's basketball team represented Longwood University during the 2009–10 NCAA Division I men's basketball season. The team was led by seventh-year head coach Mike Gillian, and played their home games at Willett Hall as a Division I independent school.

Last season
The Lancers had a record of 17–14, their best record in the Mike Gillian era.

Roster

Schedule 

|-
!colspan=9 style="background:#002B7F; color:#AFAAA3;"| Regular season

References

Longwood Lancers men's basketball seasons
Longwood
Longwood Lancers men's basketball
Long